The Dalotel DM-165 was a French two-seat training monoplane designed by Michel Dalotel. A number of variants were proposed but only the prototype was built.

Design and development
The DM-165 was a tandem two-seat low-wing monoplane. Powered by a 165 hp (121 kW) Continental IO-346A flat-four piston engine. It had a tailwheel and retractable landing gear which folded inwards. Dalotel was assisted by Société Poulet in the construction of the prototype, registered F-PPZE, which was first flown in April 1969. The aircraft was successfully tested during 1970 but despite efforts to market the aircraft none were ordered.

Variants
DM-165
Prototype with retractable landing gear and powered by a 165 hp (121 kW) Continental IO-346A piston engine, one built.
DM-125 Club
Proposed variant with fixed landing gear and powered by a 125 hp (92 kW) engine, not built.
DM-160 Club
Proposed variant with fixed landing gear and powered by a 160 hp (118 kW) engine, not built.
DM-160 Professional
Proposed variant of the DM-160 with retractable landing gear and constant speed propeller, not built.

Specifications (DM-165)

References

Notes

Bibliography

1960s French civil aircraft
Aircraft first flown in 1969
Single-engined tractor aircraft
Low-wing aircraft
Conventional landing gear